Zhang Zhongjing (150–219), formal name Zhang Ji, was a Chinese pharmacologist, physician, inventor, and writer of the Eastern Han dynasty and one of the most eminent Chinese physicians during the later years of the Han dynasty. He established medication principles and summed up the medicinal experience until that time, thus making a great contribution to the development of Traditional Chinese Medicine.

Biography 
Though well known in modern Chinese medicine and considered one of the finest Chinese physicians in history, very little is known about his life. According to later sources, he was born in Nanyang, held an official position in Changsha and lived from approximately 150 to 219 AD. Exact dates regarding his birth, death and works vary, but an upper limit of 220 AD is generally accepted.

It is also speculated that he created jiaozi ( - gyoza/dumplings/potstickers) to help people with frostbitten ears.

During his time, with warlords fighting for their own territories, many people fell victim to infectious diseases. Zhang's family was no exception. He learned medicine by studying from his towns fellow and later teacher Zhang Bozu, assimilating from previous medicinal literature such as Yellow Emperor's Inner Classic
Huangdi Neijing, and collecting many prescriptions elsewhere, finally writing the medical masterpiece Shanghan Zabing Lun (lit. "Treatise on Cold Pathogenic and Miscellaneous Diseases"). Shortly after its publication, the book was lost during the wars that ravaged China during the period of the Three Kingdoms. Because of Zhang's contribution to traditional Chinese medicine, he is often regarded as the sage of Chinese medicine.

Zhang's masterpiece, Shanghan Zabing Lun, was collected and organised later by physicians, notably Wang Shuhe from the Jin Dynasty and various court physicians during the Song Dynasty into two books, namely for the former, the Shang Han Lun (lit. "On Cold Damage"), which was mainly on a discourse on how to treat epidemic infectious diseases causing fevers prevalent during his era, and the latter, the Jingui Yaolue (lit. "Essential Prescriptions of the Golden Coffer"), a compendium of various clinical experiences which was regarded as a main discourse on internal diseases. These two texts have been heavily reconstructed several times up to the modern era. Revered for authoring the Shāng Hán Zá Bìng Lùn, Zhang Zhongjing is considered to have founded the Cold Damage or "Cold Disease" school of Chinese medicine and is widely considered the seminal expert to this day.

See also
Chinese herbology
Traditional Chinese medicine

References

Bibliography

External links
 
 

150 births
219 deaths
3rd-century Chinese physicians
Ancient pharmacologists
Chinese inventors
Chinese medical writers
Chinese pharmacologists
Deified Chinese people
Han dynasty science writers
Herbalists
Physicians from Henan
Writers from Nanyang, Henan
2nd-century Chinese physicians